Christopher Ruto  is an Anglican bishop in Kenya: he has been Bishop of Eldoret since

Notes

21st-century Anglican bishops of the Anglican Church of Kenya
Anglican bishops of Eldoret
Year of birth missing (living people)
Living people